Assumption Antipolo (abbreviated: AA) is a private, Catholic, all-girls basic education institution run by the Religious of the Assumption in the city of Antipolo, Rizal, Philippines. It was established by the Assumption sisters in 1974.

History

Early history
Sister Marie Eugénie Milleret de Brou (later canonised as Saint Marie-Eugénie de Jésus; 1817–1898) established the Congregation of the Religious of the Assumption in Paris on 30 April 1839 as a means to make a Christian transformation of society through education. The order arrived in Spanish colonial Philippines in 1892, and at the request of Queen María Cristina, consort of King Alfonso XII of Spain, they established the Superior Normal School for Women Teachers in Intramuros in 1892 which pioneered women education in the Philippines. Among its first alumnae were Rosa Sevilla de Alvero, Foundress of the Instituto de Mujeres; Librada Avelino and Carmen de Luna, who founded Centro Escolar University. At the outbreak of the Philippine Revolution of 1896, the order ceased operation of the school and returned to Europe.

Herran(Pedro Gil)-Dakota (M. Adriatico)campus
At the request of Pope Pius X, a group of anglophone Assumption Sisters returned to Manila in 1904; the Philippine Islands were by then already under American colonial rule. With the group of Sisters were Mother Helen Margaret as Superior, and Mother Rosa María, who subsequently spent most of her religious life in the Religious of the Assumption in Asia. Originally an elementary and secondary school, the College was added in 1940. Its successors are Assumption Antipolo and Assumption College San Lorenzo.

Formerly found in the genteel enclave of Ermita, the school very much resembled the renowned girls’ schools of France and the rest of Europe, becoming a favourite amongst Manila’s pre-War élite. It was considered a school for the alta de sociedad (high society) and there was no other value more emphasised than the French term noblesse oblige: “To whom much is given, much will be required.” The school was once at the corner of Calle Herran and Calle Dakota (now known as Pedro Gil and Adriatico, respectively), beside the old Padre Faura campus of the all-boys' Ateneo de Manila, where the brothers of Assumptionistas often studied. It was from this time when the so-called “Ateneo-Assumption” families sprung up, with entire clans exclusively attending either school. It offered subjects such as Spanish, French, Language and Reading in English, Arithmetic, and Religion, as well as Manners and Penmanship.

During the Second World War, the whole school and the rest of the city were destroyed by heavy aerial bombardment in the 1945 Liberation of Manila. As with many schools, Assumption College resumed classes in quonset huts and in a battered auditorium in the ruins of the Herran campus. Thru Mother Superior Rosa María Pachoud and Mother Ezperanza Ma. "Madam Espot" A. CuUnjieng brought the school back to its feet thru charity fund donation of the Family CuUnjieng Foundation and relaunched it in 1947 when the Reconstruction began, reopening in 1948. The Herran campus officially closed its doors in 1973, and today the Herran campus and the neighboring Ateneo Padre Faura campus are occupied by Robinsons Place Manila.

Architecture and culture
A vast and stately school with manicured gardens, the Assumption Convent had high-ceilinged and arcaded school buildings in the neo-Gothic style, with lush plants and numerous trees. Possessing a very French, feminine aura, the convent school sported arched windows and corridors, partly hidden floral medallions, (specifically the fleur-de-lys common to the other French girls' school, Saint Paul University Manila), and even a lagoon with boats.

The Herran (Pedro Gil) Assumption also featured one of the most impressive school chapels in Manila. Neo-Gothic in design, the chapel featured arched, stained-glass windows and a comparatively small Gothic main altar. Students of the Herran campus still observed older practices of the Catholic Church, with students made to genuflect upon entering any place where the Blessed Sacrament was kept. In those days, students also signed for fifteen-minute shifts for the adoration of the Blessed Sacrament; they were thus excused from any class. In the afternoons, the students with lacy white mantillas on their heads, filled the chapel for common adoration, ending the day with singing the Tantum Ergo.

There were also the very distinct things done within the walls of the school that through the decades would have the virtual label of "Assumption". There were the Assumption tarts (triangular tarts topped with guava jelly), and the Assumption siomai, beloved by students because of how it tasted like those made by Ma Mon Luk, a famous noodle shop. There was also Assumption cottage pie, ground meat topped with mashed potatoes served at the refectory. Students wore the distinct Assumption uniform of a tartan skirt (the fabric of which was supposedly first imported from France), sailor-collared shirts and a pin with a gold-coloured school seal. The lace-filled immaculately white uniforms called "gala dress" were reserved for more formal occasions such as Mass and Graduation Rites. Visiting guests had to contend themselves of speaking with the students in a parlour.

Girls played a ball game they called bataille and were taught to curtsey before nuns, specifically the Mother Superior whom they were taught to address as "Notre Mère" ("our mother"). A lasting hallmark of an "Old Girl" is the school's conspicuous penmanship known as "Assumption Script". Letters are distinctly long with sharp elongated points, it is a precise cursive, with flourished majuscules and jagged tails. It was a source of pride, according to Gonzales , and a way of immediately identifying an Herran Assumptionista.

Herran closure and San Lorenzo-Antipolo transfers
The school then expanded to its San Lorenzo, Makati campus, welcoming 180 students into its preparatory and elementary levels in June 1958. The following year, Assumption College San Lorenzo opened its doors to college-bound young women, and the College moved there in 1959.

After some time, the Herran campus was sold as the area was becoming a commercial and tourist centre not conducive to learning. In 1972-73, four San Lorenzo campus teachers were transferred to pave the way for merging elementary schools and secondary schools of Herran and San Lorenzo. In 1973-74, the Herran and San Lorenzo schools fused: the High School and the College were based in San Lorenzo while the Preschool and Grade School briefly occupied Herran, temporarily moving to San Lorenzo in June 1974.

The Grade School finally resettled as Assumption Antipolo along Sumulong Highway on 11 September 1974, with the Preschool staying in San Lorenzo. Assumption Antipolo, on the other hand, had its Preschool, to which it added a Kindergarten level in 1984. A High School was opened for First Year in school year 1987-88. The High School completed its four levels and had its first commencement exercises in March 1991.

The Antipolo school site also houses a Center for Service and Sharing (CSS), two Retreat houses for spiritual and social formation, the office of the Philippine Council for Peace and Global Education and PACEM that maintains an Ecology Park. With the completion of the basic education department and the stability of the school as an institution, AA became a corporation on its own in June 1997.

Response to the Church
In line with the spirit of Vatican II and in response to the call of the Church in the Philippines at the Second Plenary Council of the Philippines and the needs of the country, the Assumption in the Philippines has moved towards the rural areas and the underprivileged sector, without abandoning the education of the upper/middle classes. The majority of its schools, campus ministries, and community development works are now among farmers, tribal minorities, and the urban poor.

Elementary programs
Christian Living Education and Alay Kapwa at Kalikasan
English
Mathematics
Science
Wika at Kulturang Pilipino
Filipino
Araling Panlipunan
Music
Computer Education
Homeroom
Art
Home Economics
Physical Education (PE)
Environmental Education/AKK

High school programs
 
Junior High School:
Christian Living Education
Homeroom
Alay Kapwa
English
Filipino
Mathematics
Algebra
Statistics
Geometry
Trigonometry
Science
Lecture (Modular)
Earth Science
Biology
Chemistry
Physics
Laboratory
Investigatory Project
Araling Panlipunan
PEHM:
Physical Education
Health
Music
Technology & Home Economics (THE)
Computer Education
 
Senior High School: General Academic Strand with Electives in ABM/Arts and Design/HUMSS/STEM
21st Century Literature
Alay Kapwa
Applied Economics
Catholic Social Teaching
Christian Living Education
Christian Philosophy
Contemporary Philippine Arts in the Regions
Creative Non-Fiction
Creative Writing
Disaster Readiness and Risk Reduction
Discipline and Ideas in the Social Sciences
Earth and Life Science
Empowerment Technology
English for Academic and Professional Purposes
Entrepreneurship
Filipino sa Piling Larangan
French
General Mathematics
Homeroom
Inquiries, Investigations, and Immersion
Komunikasyon at Pananaliksik
Media and Information Literacy
Oral Communication
Organization and Management
Pagbasa at Pagsusuri ng Iba't Ibang Teksto Tungo sa Pananaliksik
Personal Development
Physical Education and Health
Physical Science
Practical Research 1
Practical Research 2
Reading and Writing
Statistics and Probability
Understanding Culture, Society, and Politics
Work Immersion
Electives
ABM (Accountancy, Business, and Management)
Business Math
Business Finance
Fundamentals of Accountancy, Business, and Management 1
Fundamentals of Accountancy, Business, and Management 2
Arts and Design
Creative Industries I: Arts and Design Appreciation and Production
Creative Industries II: Performing Arts
Integrating the Elements and Principles of Organization in the Arts
Leadership and Management in Different Arts Fields
HUMSS (Humanities and Social Sciences)
Discipline and Ideas in the Applied Social Sciences
Introduction to World Religions and Belief Systems
Philippine Politics and Governance
Trends, Networks, and Critical Thinking in the 21st Century Culture
STEM (Science, Technology, Engineering, and Mathematics)
Basic Calculus
General Biology
General Chemistry
General Physics

Traditions
Kapatiran (Seniors welcoming the Grade 7)
Clothing Ceremony (The Year 12 "clothing" the Grade 10 with the Gala Collar)
Vigil and Dawn Mass (before Christmas vacation)
Handog Pasasalamat (before Christmas vacation)
Annual School Fair and Variety Show (after Christmas vacation, in January)
Medical Dental Mission (October)
Grade 11 Benefit Dinner (February)
Seniors Legacy Night (before school year ends)

Student organizations
High School
Student Council of Assumption Antipolo (SCAA)
Youth Ministry of Assumption Antipolo (YMAA)
Plaid Ideas (Student Newspaper)
Memoirs (Yearbook)
Komusikasyon (High School Choral Group)
Pamulatan (Theatre Club)
TIERRA (Ecology Club)
Salinmusika (Philippine Instruments Club)
Yearbook Club (School Yearbook)
Protinus Anima (Animation Club)
High School Dance Club
Film Club
Sports Clubs (Football, Badminton, Lawn Tennis, Table Tennis, Swimming, Basketball, Volleyball, Frisbee, Handball, etc.)

Grade School
Junior Student Council of Assumption Antipolo (JSCAA)
Pamuso (Grade School Choral Group)
Assumption's Children's Theater (ACT CLUB/Acting Club)

Athletics
GS Basketball Varsity
HS Basketball Varsity
Football Varsity
Softball Varsity
Swimming Varsity
Volleyball Varsity
Badminton Varsity
Dance Varsity

Affiliations
ACUP – Association of Catholic Universities of the Philippines
APSA – Association of Private Schools and Administrators
CEAP – Catholic Educational Association of the Philippines
CEM – Center for Educational Measurement
PAASCU – Philippine Accrediting Association of Schools, Colleges and Universities

Notable alumnae
 Pia Arcangel – Newsreader, GMA 7
 Cory Vidanes – Channel Head, ABS-CBN

References

Sources
Assumption Antipolo
Assumption Antipolo Student Handbook

Catholic elementary schools in the Philippines
Catholic secondary schools in the Philippines
Girls' schools in the Philippines
Schools in Antipolo
Assumptionist education
1974 establishments in the Philippines
Educational institutions established in 1974